Erythropeltidales is a red algae order in the class Compsopogonophyceae.

References

Red algae orders
Compsopogonophyceae